Proctonotidae is a family of sea slugs, nudibranchs, marine gastropod molluscs, in the clade Euthyneura.

Genera 
Genera in the family Proctonotidae include:
 Caldukia Burn and Miller, 1969  
 Proctonotus Alder, 1844
Genera brought into synonymy
 Venilia Alder & Hancock, 1844: synonym of Proctonotua Alder & Hancock, 1844
 Zephyrina Quatrefages, 1844: synonym of Proctonotus Alder & Hancock, 1844

References 

 Vaught, K.C. (1989). A classification of the living Mollusca. American Malacologists: Melbourne, FL (USA). . XII, 195 pp

 
Taxa named by John Edward Gray